Ciliogenesis is defined as the building of the cell's antenna (primary cilia) or extracellular fluid mediation mechanism (motile cilium).  It includes the assembly and disassembly of the cilia during the cell cycle.  Cilia are important organelles of cells and are involved in numerous activities such as cell signaling, processing developmental signals, and directing the flow of fluids such as mucus over and around cells.  Due to the importance of these cell processes, defects in ciliogenesis can lead to numerous human diseases related to non-functioning cilia. Ciliogenesis may also play a role in the development of left/right handedness in humans.

Cilia formation 
Ciliogenesis occurs through an ordered set of steps.  First, the basal bodies from centrioles must migrate to the surface of the cell and attach to the cortex.  Along the way, the basal bodies attach to membrane vesicles and the basal body/membrane vesicle complex fuses with the plasma membrane of the cell.  Fusion with the plasma membrane is likely what forms the membrane of the cilia.  The alignment of the forming cilia is determined by the original positioning and orientation of the basal bodies.  Once the alignment is determined, axonemal microtubules extend from the basal body and go beneath the developing ciliary membrane, forming the cilia.

Proteins must be synthesized in the cytoplasm of the cell and cannot be synthesized within cilia.  For the cilium to elongate, proteins must be selectively imported from the cytoplasm into the cilium and transported to the tip of the cilium by intraflagellar transport (IFT). Once the cilium is completely formed, it continues to incorporate new tubulin at the tip of the cilia.  However, the cilium does not elongate further, because older tubulin is simultaneously degraded.  This requires an active mechanism that maintains ciliary length.  Impairments in these mechanisms can affect the motility of the cell and cell signaling between cells.

Ciliogenesis types 
Most cilia (also known as flagella) form as a separate compartment in the cell and the process is named compartmentalized ciliogenesis.  However,  the flagellum, a particular type of cilium found in the sperm is formed in a unique way, which is named cytosolic ciliogenesis (also known as cytoplasmic ciliogenesis), since, in this type of ciliogenesis, the cilium axoneme is formed in the cytoplasm or get exposed to the cytoplasm.

Ciliopathies 

Ciliary defects can lead to a broad range of human diseases known as ciliopathies that are caused by mutations in ciliary proteins. Some common ciliopathies include primary ciliary dyskinesia, hydrocephalus, polycystic liver and kidney disease, and some forms of retinal degeneration. Some research has shown that mutations in ciliary proteins can lead to other developmental and adult phenotypes such as nephronophthisis, Bardet–Biedl syndrome, Alström syndrome, and Meckel–Gruber syndrome.

Regulation 
Different cells use their cilia for different purposes, such as sensory signaling or the movement of fluid. For this reason, when cilia form and how long they are differ from cell to cell. The processes controlling ciliary formation, degradation, and length must all be regulated in some way to ensure that each cell is able to perform its necessary tasks.

Formation and removal 

As the cell containing the cilium goes through the cell cycle, ciliogenesis must be regulated. Cilia usually form during the G1 of the cell cycle and disassemble during mitosis. It is not known why the cilia assemble and then disassemble, but it is believed that the presence of cilia may interfere with mitosis and, therefore, are removed before mitosis occurs.

Cells that have recently divided and are in the G0 stage of the cell cycle do not have cilia. During G1, the mother centriole attaches at the cell cortex and forms the cilium. During S-phase, the mother centrioles and daughter centrioles (new centrioles) duplicate and new daughter centrioles are formed. Before mitosis can occur in most cells, the cilium is resorbed back into the cell. After the original cell divides into its two new cells, the cilia reform within the cells after the new cells enter G1.

Length 

Each type of cell has a specific optimal length for its cilia which therefore need to be regulated to ensure optimal function of the cell. Some of the same processes that are used to control the formation and removal of cilia (such as IFT) are thought to be used in the regulation of cilia length. The regulation of ciliary length is very important because it affects how the cell is able to use its cilia to move fluid over its surface or conduct cellular signaling.  Different ciliopathies can be caused by defects in ciliary length. For instance, proteins that have been shown to cause Meckel–Gruber syndrome affect ciliary length control. However, the mechanisms that affect ciliary length control are not understood very well. Until they are, it will be difficult to determine how defects in ciliary length may related to ciliopathic diseases and syndromes.

References 

Cell biology
Organelles